Domenico Lo Vasco (20 April 1928—17 April 2020) was an Italian politician and lawyer.

He was member of the Christian Democracy Party. He served as Mayor of Palermo from 1990 to 1992. He was a member of the regional committee between 1980 and 1986.

After 1997, he worked solely as a criminal lawyer in 1997. He was a municipal councilor of Palermo for five years.

Biography
Domenico Lo Vasco was born in Brescia, Italy on 1928 and died in Palermo, Italy on 2020 at the age of 91. He was a criminal lawyer. He was graduated in political science and law.

See also
 List of mayors of Palermo

References

External links
 Domenico Lo Vasco on radioradicale.it

1928 births
2020 deaths
Jurists from Palermo
Christian Democracy (Italy) politicians
21st-century Italian politicians
20th-century Italian politicians
Mayors of Palermo
20th-century Italian lawyers